Ullern Idrettsforening is a Norwegian multi-sports club from Ullern, Oslo. It has sections for association football, team handball, basketball, bandy and cheerleading. The club colors are white and red.

General history
The club was founded in 1971 as a merger of the multi-sports club Liull, the multi-sports club Bestum IF (founded 1914), the gymnastics club Lilleaker TF and Ullern Basket (founded 1956). Liull was in turn a merger of the skiing club Ullern SK (founded 1909) and Lilleaker IF (founded 1913). The club counts 1909 as its founding year.

Lilleaker IF had been named Fagforeningenes IL, Lysaker from 1913 to 1924. That year, the Workers' Sports Federation was founded, but membership for Lilleaker IF here was voted down. As a result, the splinter club Fagforeningenes IL, Lilleaker was established. LIF and Fagen were reunited again in 1936, on the condition that the membership in the Workers' Sports Federation was retained. This federation was discontinued after the Second World War, as the club was also merged with Ullern SK to Liull (a portmanteau of the two names).

Lilleaker TF was originally the women's section of Fagen, founded on 3 October 1929. Following the merger in 1936, the gymnastics section broke away in 1938 to found the gymnastics club Najaden. It was too a member of the Worker's Sports Federation. The club was then renamed Lilleaker TF in 1945, and became a part of the large merger in 1971.

Ullern IF or its predecessors have had sections (which are now defunct) for track and field, amateur boxing, amateur wrestling, gymnastics, judo, Nordic skiing, alpine skiing and tennis.

Football
The men's football team currently plays in the Norwegian Second Division, the third tier of the Norwegian football league system, after winning promotion from the 2021 Norwegian Third Division.

Recent seasons

Source:

References

External links
Official site

Sport in Oslo
Sports clubs established in 1909
Bandy clubs established in 1909
Association football clubs established in 1909
1909 establishments in Norway
Defunct athletics clubs in Norway
Football clubs in Oslo
Bandy clubs in Norway